Hama Himeyn is a 2004 Maldivian film directed by Ahmed Nimal. Produced by Sama and Ziya under Corona Arts, the film stars Ali Seezan, Khadheeja Ibrahim Didi and Nashidha Mohamed in pivotal roles. The story of the film was written in 1998 by Mahdi Ahmed and re-written with a modern perspective when director Ahmed Nimal shared his intention to direct a film for his story.

Premise
Several years later, Aminath (Niuma Mohamed) returns from Madras after completing her studies and meets her ex-boyfriend, Faisal (Ali Seezan) who is now married to an emotionally immature wife, Fazeela (Khadheeja Ibrahim Didi). As the film moves forward, Faisal's past life as a drug addict unfolds. Faisal shows up drunk at Aminath's birthday party where he ends their relationship and attacks his father Zahir (Chilhiya Moosa Manik) at home. He was then exiled to another island where he meets Fazeela and her aunt, Nashidha (Nashidha Mohamed).

Cast 
 Ali Seezan as Faisal
 Khadheeja Ibrahim Didi as Fazeela
 Nashidha Mohamed as Nashidha
 Ali Shameel as Adnan
 Niuma Mohamed as Aminath
 Chilhiya Moosa Manik as Zahir
 Mohamed Manik as Muruthala
 Shameema as Faisal's mother
 Ahmed Nimal as Habeeb; Nashidha's husband
 Ahmed Latheef as Nashidha
 Saiman
 Ahmed Azmeel as Ibrahim; a friend of Faisal
 Yoosuf Shafeeu as Dr. Ibrahim (special appearance)

Soundtrack

Response
Upon release, the film received mixed to negative reviews from critics and did average business at boxoffice. In an interview, screenwriter Mahdi Ahmed shared his dissatisfaction towards his writing standards in the film and shared his experience of watching the movie in cinema as an "embarrassing" moment.

References

External links 
 

Maldivian drama films
2004 films
Films directed by Ahmed Nimal
2004 drama films
Dhivehi-language films